Tally All the Things That You Broke is an EP by the American indie rock band Parquet Courts, released on October 8, 2013 on What's Your Rupture?. Released under the name Parkay Quarts, the EP was recorded during the initial sessions for the band's third studio album, Sunbathing Animal (2014).

Track listing

References

2013 EPs
Parquet Courts albums
What's Your Rupture? albums